Kohr is a surname. Notable persons with that name include:

 Dominik Kohr (born 1994), German footballer
 Harald Kohr (born 1962), German football coach and player
 Leopold Kohr (1909–1994), Austrian economist, jurist and political scientist

See also
 KOHR
 Kohrs

de:Kohr